Salima (also spelled Salimeh) is a municipality in the Baabda District of Mount Lebanon Governorate, Lebanon. There is one public school in the village with 130 students as of 2006.

References

Populated places in Baabda District
Druze communities in Lebanon